The Ellesmere Chaucer, or Ellesmere Manuscript of the Canterbury Tales, is an early 15th-century illuminated manuscript of Geoffrey Chaucer's Canterbury Tales, owned by the Huntington Library, in San Marino, California (EL 26 C 9). It is considered one of the most significant copies of the Tales.

History
Written most likely in the first or second decade of the fifteenth century, the early history of the manuscript is uncertain, but it seems to have been owned by John de Vere, 12th Earl of Oxford (1408–1462). The manuscript takes its popular name from the fact that it later belonged to Sir Thomas Egerton (1540–1617), Baron Ellesmere and Viscount Brackley, who apparently obtained it from Roger North, 2nd Baron North (1530/31-1600). The library of manuscripts, known as the Bridgewater Library, remained at the Egerton house, Ashridge, Hertfordshire, until 1802 when it was removed to London. Francis Egerton, created Earl of Ellesmere in 1846, inherited the library, and it remained in the family until its sale to Henry Huntington by John Francis Granville Scrope Egerton (1872–1944), 4th Earl of Ellesmere. Huntington purchased the Bridgewater library privately in 1917 through Sotheby's. The manuscript is now in the collection of the Huntington Library in San Marino, California (EL 26 C 9).

Description
The Ellesmere manuscript is a highly polished example of scribal workmanship, with a great deal of elaborate illumination and, notably, a series of illustrations of the various narrators of the Tales (including a famous one of Chaucer himself, mounted on a horse). As such, it was clearly a de luxe product, commissioned by a very wealthy patron.

The manuscript is written on fine vellum and the leaves are approximately 400mm by 284mm in size; there are 240 leaves, of which 232 contain the text of the Tales.

Illuminations 
In order of appearance in the Ellesmere Chaucer (note that not all storytellers have an illumination):

Knight (fol. 10r)
Miller (fol. 34v)
Reeve (fol. 42r)
Cook (fol. 47r)
Man of Law (fol. 50v)
Wife of Bath (fol. 72r)
Friar (fol. 76v)
Summoner (fol. 81r)
Clerk of Oxford (fol. 88r)
Merchant (fol. 102v)
Squire (fol. 115v)
Franklin (fol. 123v)
Physician (fol. 133r)
Pardoner (fol. 138r)
Shipman (fol. 143v)
Prioress (fol. 148v)
Chaucer (fol. 153v)
Monk and his greyhounds (fol. 169r)
Nun's Priest (fol. 179r)
Second Nun (fol. 187r)
Canon's Yeoman (fol. 194r)
Manciple (fol. 203r)
Parson (fol. 206v)

Scribe and its relation to other manuscripts

The Ellesmere manuscript is thought to be very early in date, being written shortly after Chaucer's death. It is seen as an important source for efforts to reconstruct Chaucer's original text and intentions, though John M. Manly and Edith Rickert in their Text of the Canterbury Tales (1940) noted that whoever edited the manuscript probably made substantial revisions, tried to regularise spelling, and put the individual Tales into a smoothly running order. Up until this point the Ellesmere manuscript had been used as the 'base text' by several editions, such as that of W. W. Skeat, with variants checked against British Library, Harley MS 7334.

Linne Mooney identified Ellesmere's scribe as Adam Pinkhurst, a man employed by Chaucer himself, but recent scholarship has claimed that this identification is without merit. The same scribe appears to have been responsible for writing the Hengwrt Manuscript of the Tales, now considered the earliest, most authoritative, and closest to Chaucer's holograph. This would also imply, however, that the revisions seen in the Ellesmere manuscript would have been carried out by someone who had worked with Chaucer, knew his intentions for the Tales, and had access to draft materials.

The Ellesmere manuscript is conventionally referred to as El in studies of the Tales and their textual history. A facsimile edition is available.

References

External links

The Ellesmere mss at the Huntington Library
Huntington catalogue images of Ellesmere Chaucer at Digital Scriptorium 
Full digital facsimile on the Huntington Digital Library
Ezard, John, 'The scrivener's tale: how Chaucer's sloppy copyist was unmasked after 600 years', The Guardian, 20 July 2004
Nagle, M. Finding Adam, Umaine Today, November–December 2004

Literary illuminated manuscripts
The Canterbury Tales
Collection of the Huntington Library
English manuscripts